David Robb (18 February 1903 – July 1992) was a Scottish footballer who played for Dundee, Wigan Borough, Chesterfield and New Brighton.

References

1903 births
1992 deaths
People from Leith
Footballers from Edinburgh
Scottish footballers
Association football wing halves
Dundee F.C. players
English Football League players
Wigan Borough F.C. players
Chesterfield F.C. players
New Brighton A.F.C. players